Abby Robinson is an American photographer. Robinson is known for her AutoWorks series of self-portraits, taken over a period of 40 years. Her work is included in the collections of the Whitney Museum of American Art, the Portland Museum of Art and the Houston Museum of Fine Arts.

References

American women photographers
Living people
Year of birth missing (living people)
21st-century American women